Mieke Kröger (born 18 July 1993) is a German track and road racing cyclist, who rides for UCI Women's WorldTeam .

Career
In November 2015, she was announced as part of the  team's inaugural squad for the 2016 season. In October 2017, the-then  announced that Kröger would join them for the 2018 season, with the aim of developing her ability in road races alongside her time trialling.

Major results
Source:

Road

2010
 National Junior Championships
1st  Time trial
3rd Road race
2011
 National Junior Championships
1st  Road race
1st  Time trial
 3rd  Time trial, UCI Junior World Championships
2012
 2nd  Time trial, UEC European Under-23 Championships
2013
 5th Time trial, UEC European Under-23 Championships
2014
 1st  Time trial, UEC European Under-23 Championships
 4th Time trial, UCI World Championships
2015
 1st  Team time trial, UCI World Championships
 UEC European Under-23 Championships
1st  Time trial
7th Road race
 1st  Time trial, National Championships
2016
 1st  Road race, National Championships
 2nd  Team time trial, UCI World Championships
2017
 3rd Crescent Vårgårda UCI Women's WorldTour TTT
2019
 1st  Overall Belgium Tour
1st Stage 1
 1st Stage 2 Healthy Ageing Tour
 Gracia–Orlová
1st Stages 2a (ITT) & 4
 2nd  Mixed team relay, UCI World Championships
 UEC European Championships
2nd  Mixed team relay
6th Time trial
 2nd Time trial, National Championships
 2nd Chrono Champenois
 4th Overall BeNe Ladies Tour
2020
 1st  Mixed team relay, UEC European Championships
 8th Time trial, UCI World Championships
 10th Overall Challenge by La Vuelta
2021
 1st  Mixed team relay, UCI World Championships
 2nd  Mixed team relay, UEC European Championships
 2nd Overall BeNe Ladies Tour
 3rd Chrono des Nations
2022
 10th Overall BeNe Ladies Tour

Track

2011
 1st  Individual pursuit, UCI World Junior Championships
 1st  Individual pursuit, National Junior Championships
2012
 National Championships
1st  Individual pursuit
2nd Team pursuit
2013
 1st  Omnium, National Championships
2014
 1st  Individual pursuit, UEC European Under-23 Championships
 2nd  Individual pursuit, UEC European Championships
2015
 1st  Individual pursuit, National Championships
 UEC European Under-23 Championships
2nd  Team pursuit
3rd  Individual pursuit
2018
 3rd  Team pursuit, UEC European Championships
2019
 Team pursuit, 2019–20 UCI Track Cycling World Cup
2nd  Minsk
2nd  Glasgow
 2nd  Team pursuit, UEC European Championships
2021
 1st  Team pursuit, Olympic Games
 UCI World Championships
1st  Team pursuit
3rd  Individual pursuit
 UEC European Championships
1st  Team pursuit
3rd  Individual pursuit
2022
 UCI Track Nations Cup, Glasgow
1st  Individual pursuit
1st  Team pursuit
 UEC European Championships
1st  Individual pursuit
1st  Team pursuit

References

External links

 
 
 
 

1993 births
Living people
German female cyclists
Sportspeople from Bielefeld
Olympic cyclists of Germany
Cyclists at the 2016 Summer Olympics
Cyclists at the 2020 Summer Olympics
Medalists at the 2020 Summer Olympics
Olympic medalists in cycling
Olympic gold medalists for Germany
UCI Track Cycling World Champions (women)
Cyclists from North Rhine-Westphalia
20th-century German women
21st-century German women